Lieven de Key (1560 – 17 July 1627) was a Dutch renaissance architect in the Netherlands, mostly known today for his works in Haarlem. His style is described by Simon Schama as Mannerist.

Biography

De Key was born in Ghent, and was already a well-known architect when the Haarlem council invited him to become city architect in 1592 to succeed Wouter den Abt. He brought to Haarlem the same Dutch renaissance style that Hendrick de Keyser brought to Amsterdam. Everything attributed to him or his followers, whether a building, a doorway, or merely a gable stone, is considered a rijksmonument today. 

The reason so many buildings in Haarlem can be attributed to him is because Haarlem had suffered a severe fire in 1576 that destroyed a third of the city, and plans were underway for large city projects when he was appointed city architect. Before working in Haarlem and Leiden, De Key had worked in London from 1580–1591.  He died in Haarlem, aged about 77.

In more recent times, many streetnames, buildings and e.g. one of the largest housing companies in Amsterdam, have been named after him.

Buildings designed

 Front facade of the city hall of Leiden
 The Vleeshal in Haarlem, 1602–1603
 The gymnasium in Leiden
 The tower of the St. Anna church in Haarlem, which still exists, though the rest of the church was demolished and rebuilt by Jacob van Campen
 The Waag in Haarlem, 1595
 North wing of the city hall of Haarlem, 1620
 The stone entranceway to the Proveniershuis in Haarlem, 1592
 The facade of the main hall of the Frans Hals Museum, 1604–1609
 The gateway of the St. Barbara Gasthuis, 1624

References

Sources 
 Deugd boven geweld, Een geschiedenis van Haarlem, 1245–1995, edited by Gineke van der Ree-Scholtens, 1995, 

1560 births
1627 deaths
Dutch Golden Age architects
Dutch Baroque architects
Architects from Ghent
Artists from Haarlem
17th-century Dutch architects
16th-century Dutch architects